The Zigong Salt History Museum is a museum in Zigong, Sichuan Province, Southwest China.  It is housed in the Xiqin Guildhall, originally built in 1736-1752 by salt merchants from Shaanxi. This was during the reign of the Qianlong Emperor of the Qing dynasty. The building is a Major Historical and Cultural Site of China. The current museum was due to the urging of Deng Xiaoping and completed in 1959.

Guildhall
Xiqin Guildhall (also known as the Guandi Hall) was funded by the Shaanxi salt tradesmen, and used as a meeting place for salt merchants from Shaanxi, the main conduit for the Zigong salt. Another building nearby was the Guild Hall for the salt merchants of Sichuan upon the bank of the Fuxi (pronounced "fu'shee") River (a tributary of the Tuo River), and a major transportation resource where the waiting ships would pack in so that once laden they would feed into China's major river and canal system). The guild hall took sixteen years to build at a great cost. It has a splendid exterior and exquisite internal structure and decoration, including many delicate stone and wooden carvings. It exemplifies the sophisticated level of architecture technology of its age and symbolized the of wealth of the salt merchants. The interior contains a large courtyard with a stone centerpiece of a dragon and phoenix. The guild hall once often hosted Sichuan opera for salt merchants as well as local elites in festivals. The exterior of the guild hall building features elaborate flying eaves and a gilded wooden carved interior based around a large galleried atrium where plays were once performed. Exhibits in the museum cover the entire history of salt mining dating from the Han dynasty.

Background

The Zigong Salt History Museum helps to preserve knowledge related to the socially, politically, and economically important development of salt production, especially concentrating in the Zigong area. Historically, salt was derived through drilling into brine aquifers of the Sichuan Basin, with extensive exploitation by the Song dynasty. The resulting brine extracted from the salt well was then evaporated into solid salt. The Zigong Salt Museum has an extensive selection of such tools. Drilling techniques were sophisticated, enabling wells hundreds of meters deep and eventually over one thousand (in 1835) using percussive drilling, advanced derricks, specialized bits, flexible tubing, and included methods of dealing with extracting lost tools and dealing with cave ins and well repairs. Evaporation was often accomplished using natural gas burners, with the gas derived from the same Jialingjiang Formation Triassic geological structure group as the salt was also derived from.

See also
 List of museums in China
 List of food and beverage museums
 Salt in Chinese history

External link
official site (in Chinese)

References

Museums in Sichuan
Salt museums
1736 establishments in China
Mining museums in China
Zigong
Major National Historical and Cultural Sites in Sichuan
National first-grade museums of China